Szólád is a village in Somogy county, Hungary.

The settlement is part of the Balatonboglár wine region.

Main sights
 Reformed church (built in 1896)
 Monument of the heroes of the First World War
 Country houses
 Roman Catholic church (built between 1775 and 1782)
 Holy cross before the Roman Catholic church
 Wine cellars

Gallery

External links 
 Street map (Hungarian)

References 

Populated places in Somogy County